Charles Orlando Jenkins (May 28, 1872 – August 30, 1952) was an American college football coach, lawyer, and shipbuilder. He served as the head football coach at Western Reserve University from 1894 to 1896 and at the University of North Carolina at Chapel Hill in 1901, compiling a career coaching record of 19–9–5.

Jenkins was born on May 28, 1872, in Cleveland. He attended Central High School in Cleveland and spent a year at Harvard University before moving on Yale University, from which he graduated in 1894. Jenkins was a substitute on the Yale Bulldogs football team, playing as a tackle. He graduated from Harvard Law School in 1901. After he graduated from Harvard, Jenkins formed a law practice with Roger M. Lee under the name of Lee and Jenkins, which focused on admiralty law. He later ran the Jenkins Steamship Company, which built and operated steel freight steamers. Jenkins died in 1952.

Head coaching record

References

External links
 

1872 births
1952 deaths
American lawyers
American shipbuilders
Case Western Spartans football coaches
North Carolina Tar Heels football coaches
Harvard Law School alumni
Yale University alumni
Sportspeople from Cleveland